Ng Ling Ling (born 1972) is a Singaporean politician, banker and civil servant. A member of the governing People's Action Party (PAP), she has been the Member of Parliament (MP) representing the Jalan Kayu division of Ang Mo Kio GRC since 2020.

Education 
Ng attended Raffles Girls' School and Raffles Junior College. She graduated from Nanyang Technological University with a Bachelor of Accountancy in 1994 and completed a Master of Public Administration at the Australian National University in 2003.

Career 
On graduation, Ng was in the banking industry for six years. In 2001, she joined the social service sector by working at the National Council of Social Service. Ng became the managing director of the Community Chest for five years, stepping down in June 2018. Ng was the former chief of future primary care and director of community engagement at the Ministry of Health's Office for Healthcare Transformation.

Political career 
Ng was fielded in the 2020 general election to contest in Ang Mo Kio GRC when Ang Hin Kee and
Intan Azura Mokhtar stepped down from their respective wards and politics. She is on the People's Action Party's (PAP) ticket against the Reform Party. Ng's running mates were Lee Hsien Loong, Darryl David, Gan Thiam Poh and Nadia Ahmad Samdin. On 11 July 2020, Ng and the PAP team were declared elected Members of Parliament representing Ang Mo Kio GRC in the 14th Parliament after garnering 71.91% of the valid votes. She was then appointed deputy chairwoman of the Health Government Parliamentary Committee (GPC) in Parliament.

Accolades 
Ng was awarded 2018 Her World Woman of the Year for her work in the Community Chest of Singapore.

Personal life 
Ng grew up in a three-room HDB flat. She is married with one son.

References

External links
 Ng Ling Ling on Parliament of Singapore

Singaporean women in politics
People's Action Party politicians
Raffles Girls' Secondary School alumni
Raffles Junior College alumni
1972 births
Living people
Members of the Parliament of Singapore